The Hijagang (Meitei pronunciation: hī-ja-gāng) is a boathouse inside the Kangla Fort in Imphal, India. It houses four traditional Meitei watercraft, including two hiyang hirens (Royal racing boats) and two tanna his (commoners' racing boats). According to Meitei religious beliefs, the hiyang hirens are used by the male ancestral deity and female ancestral deity and are sacred to the Meiteis, the major ethnic group of Manipur.

Construction and inauguration 
The construction of the Hijagang watercraft storage building started in the year 2010 and completed in the year 2013. 

Featuring watercrafts

Crafting processes and inaugural 
According to RK Nimai, the then Commissioner of the Department of Arts and Culture, Government of Manipur, the two kinds of watercrafts were made from special kind of trees brought from Khamsom village in Senapati district of Manipur. The crafting processes were initiated in Khamsom in the year 2007. Later, the woods for crafting the Hiyang Hirens were brought to the Kangla on 6 June 2007, with the work of sculpturing getting commenced 2 days later. The watercrafts were made by a four-member team under the leadership of craftsman L. Thoiba. Later, the watercrafts were inaugurated on 19 February 2010 (3 years before the completion of the building construction).

Crafting materials used 
The hiyang hiren are made of uningthou and the tanna hi of tairen.

Lengths, widths and heights

See also 
 Hiyang Hiren
 Hiyang Tannaba
 Heikru Hidongba 
 Kangla Sanathong
 Statue of Meidingu Nara Singh
 Manipur State Museum

Notes

References

External links 

 Hijagang at e-pao.net Gallery

Meitei architecture
Cultural heritage of India
Landmarks in India
Meitei culture
Monuments and memorials in India
Monuments and memorials in Imphal
Monuments and memorials in Manipur
Monuments and memorials to Meitei people
Monuments and memorials to Meitei royalties
Museums in Manipur
Public art in India
Tourist attractions in India